Lisa Crittenden (born 1962) is an Australian actress, noted for her roles in various television series, such as The Restless Years (as Briony Thompson, 1981), The Sullivans (as Sally Meredith), Prisoner (as Maxine Daniels 1982–83), Sons and Daughters (as Leigh Palmer 1985–86), Rafferty's Rules (1988) and the New Zealand produced Shortland Street (as Carrie Burton 1992–93).

She had 3 roles in drama Blue Heelers and also played a lead role in mini-series Whose Baby? and made a guest appearance as Gabrielle's mother Hecuba in Xena: Warrior Princess.

Personal life 
Crittenden has been married to Gary Moore, a freelance director of photography, since 1986. She currently resides in Melbourne, Australia with her husband, and two sons.

Filmography

References

External links
 

1962 births
Australian film actresses
Australian soap opera actresses
Living people
20th-century Australian actresses
21st-century Australian actresses
People from Williamstown, Victoria
Actresses from Melbourne